Elena Yakovishina (born September 17, 1992 in Petropavlovsk-Kamchatsky, Russia) is an alpine skier from Russia. She competed for Russia at the 2014 Winter Olympics in the alpine skiing events.

Biography 
She was born on September 17, 1992 in the city of Petropavlovsk-Kamchatsky, Russia. She was born hearing-impaired, her disability certificate was issued in 2016.

For the first time she stood on mountain skis when she was three years old, her parents haven't had peace of mind ever since. When she was 5 years old, she was admitted to Edelveis Ski School in Petropavlovsk-Kamchatsky to be trained by honored Russian coach A. Katalagin.

Now Elena is training alone in Europe with some helps from boyfriend Cristian Simari Birkner. She doesn't have sponsors for have a coach or join some commertial team.

Education. Higher (baccalaureate). In 2016 she graduated with honors from the Russian State University of Physical Education, Sport, Youth and Tourism (SCOLIPE), with a qualification of an Alpine Skiing coach-teacher.

Career in healthy sport 
First World Cup start - 29.01.2012 St. Moritz (SUI).

On Olympic Games 2014 in Sochi she was 14th place in Combination, 28th in Downhill and 24th in Super-G.

On winter Universiade 2017 Alma-Ati she got 1st place in super-g.

Career in deaf sport 
So, from 2016 Elena is racing in deaf sport. Many times she won Russian deaf national championship.

She raced in Deaflympic games 2019 and did greatest results for Russian deaf alpine ski sport. 4 gold and 1 silver medal in Santa Caterina (Italy)

She did also second World deaf alpine skiing championship 2017 where she won three gold and two silver medals.

Equipments 
She is using skis and boots from Atomic and ski poles from Leki.

References

1992 births
Living people
Olympic alpine skiers of Russia
Alpine skiers at the 2014 Winter Olympics
Russian female alpine skiers
Deaf skiers
Universiade medalists in alpine skiing
People from Petropavlovsk-Kamchatsky
Russian deaf people
Universiade gold medalists for Russia
Competitors at the 2017 Winter Universiade
Deaflympic alpine skiers of Russia
Deaflympic gold medalists for Russia
Deaflympic silver medalists for Russia
Alpine skiers at the 2019 Winter Deaflympics
Medalists at the 2019 Winter Deaflympics